O'Reilly is an unincorporated community located in Bolivar County, Mississippi, United States, along U.S. Route 61. O'Reilly is located on the former Yazoo and Mississippi Valley Railroad. 

A post office operated under the name O'Reilly from 1903 to 1926.

References

Unincorporated communities in Bolivar County, Mississippi
Unincorporated communities in Mississippi